Total Exposure is a 1991 direct to video crime thriller directed by John Quinn, written by Quinn with Lynne Dahlgren, and starring Season Hubley and Michael Nouri.  It has notably been described as a far better than average exploitation movie.  Among the supporting cast is Playboy Playmate Deborah Driggs.

Plot

Top female photographer Andi (Season Hubley) returns from a glamor photo session in Mexico, only to find a stash of cocaine in her bag, smuggled in by her star model Kathy (Deborah Driggs).  Considering her own prior convictions, and fearing the police, she dumps the entire stash down the drain immediately.  Kathy denies responsibility and eventually turns up dead.  And now, there are some nasty people who don't quite believe anybody, let alone a former junkie, would flush away a fortune in drugs, and they want it back, or else!  She gets ex-cop Dave Murphy (Michael Nouri) to protect her from the killer criminal (Jeff Conaway).

Cast

 Michael Nouri as Dave Murphy
 Season Hubley as Andi Robinson
 Jeff Conaway as Peter Keynes
 Bob Delegall as Detective Collins
 Deborah Driggs as Kathy
 Anthony Russell as Harry
 Kristine Rose as Rita
 Dean Devlin as Adult Bookstore Manager
 Christian Bocher as Mark
 Robert Prentiss Zack
 Linda Hoffman as Patty
 Martina Castle as Cissy
 Dennis Paladino as Detective Alberts
 Jennifer Perito as  Molly
 John F. Goff as Arthur
 Connie Craig as Patricia Keynes
 Wendy Gordon as TV News Anchorwoman
 Chris Neilsen as Jimmy
 James Patten Eagle as Sleazy TV Director
 Mark Harigian as Fitness Trainer

Reception
TV Guide called the film a "predictable, if well-produced, urban thriller". They write that John Quinn directs "with occasional verve", and the acting is fine, including that of veteran leads Hubley and Nouri, and "there are some spunky bit parts", but it was felt "Lynn Dahlgren and Quinn's convoluted screenplay is tiresomely familiar".  In Thrilling Detective relates "Michael Nouri is almost interesting as low-key Los Angeles private eye", and toward the film writes it was not "a bad film, but really pretty standard, run-of-the-mill fare", and of Michael Nouri's character, "Murphy's soft-spokeness, and easy-going spin on things might have been developed a bit more, but there's not much else really interesting going on, except maybe for catching Jeff Conaway as the aforementioned DA."  VideoHound's Golden Movie Retriever describes the film as "total idiocy involving unclad babes and hormonally imbalanced men in blackmail and murder".

References

External links
 Total Exposure at the Internet Movie Database

1990s English-language films
Films directed by John Quinn